Tatyana Roslanova (née Khajimuradova) (born 28 September 1980) is a Kazakhstani runner who specializes in the 400 and 800 metres.

Achievements

Personal bests
400 metres – 50.68 s (2004)
800 metres – 1:59.50 min (2004)

References

1980 births
Living people
Kazakhstani female sprinters
Kazakhstani female middle-distance runners
Athletes (track and field) at the 2004 Summer Olympics
Olympic athletes of Kazakhstan
Asian Games medalists in athletics (track and field)
Athletes (track and field) at the 2002 Asian Games
Universiade medalists in athletics (track and field)
Asian Games silver medalists for Kazakhstan
Medalists at the 2002 Asian Games
Universiade bronze medalists for Kazakhstan
Medalists at the 2005 Summer Universiade
20th-century Kazakhstani women
21st-century Kazakhstani women